Kapuk is a subdistrict in the Cengkareng district of Indonesia. An industrial area, Kapuk is nonetheless also home to part of Pantai Indah Kapuk, one of Jakarta's most prestigious suburbs.

History

Kapuk formed part of the particuliere landerij or private domain of Tan Eng Goan, 1st Majoor der Chinezen of Batavia, and later of his successor, the 2nd Majoor Tan Tjoen Tiat.

It later formed part of the landholdings of N.V. Landbouw Maatschappij Tan Tiang Po, a colonial company belonging to Luitenant der Chinezen Tan Tiang Po and his son, Tan Liok Tiauw, Landheeren (or landlords) of Batoe-Tjepper.

In 1988, the property developer Ciputra, backed by Indonesia's wealthiest man at the time Sudono Salim, developed the housing estate of Pantai Indah Kapuk, earmarked as a wealthy suburb of gated communities.

Kapuk's postal code is 11720.

See also 
 Pantai Indah Kapuk
 Cengkareng
 List of administrative villages of Jakarta

References

Administrative villages in Jakarta